Richard Abena (born 25 May 1960) is a retired Cameroonian football defender. Capped for Cameroon in 1987 and 1988, he played in the victorious 1988 Africa Cup of Nations Final.

References

1960 births
Living people
Cameroonian footballers
Cameroon international footballers
1988 African Cup of Nations players
Africa Cup of Nations-winning players
Canon Yaoundé players
Association football defenders